Third Armored may refer to:

3rd Armored Division (United States)
3d Armored Cavalry Regiment (United States)